The Emporia station of Emporia, Kansas was built in 1884 and served the Atchison, Topeka and Santa Fe Railway until 1971.  Thereafter, passenger service continued under Amtrak, with the Texas Chief and Super Chief.  In 1974, these trains were renamed the Lone Star and Southwest Limited respectively.  In 1979, service on the Lone Star was discontinued. Once again, the Southwest Limited would be renamed the Southwest Chief in 1984. Service ceased completely in 1997.  The depot was demolished after a severe fire in 1999.

References

External links
Emporia, Kansas– TrainWeb

Former Amtrak stations in Kansas
Former Atchison, Topeka and Santa Fe Railway stations
1884 establishments in Kansas
Railway stations in the United States opened in 1884
Railway stations closed in 1997